Our Lady Star of the Sea, Seaforth is a Roman Catholic church in Seaforth, Merseyside, England.  Its building is listed.

Origins
The church was founded in 1884, when it began services in a former stable.  Its building was designed by Sinnott, Sinnott & Powell.  The church was consecrated in 1909.

Listed building
The church building is a Grade II listed building.

References

Roman Catholic churches in Merseyside